Malling may refer to:

 Malling Rural Sanitary District, Kent, England - (1875–1894)
 East Malling and West Malling, a village and town in the above Rural Sanitary District
 Malling Abbey, an abbey of Anglican Benedictine nuns located in West Malling
 Malling series, rootstocks for apple trees, classified at the East Malling Research Station
 Malling, Moselle, France
 Malling, Denmark
 Amalie Malling, Danish classical pianist
 Rasmus Malling-Hansen, Danish inventor, minister and principal at the Royal Institute for the Deaf
 Otto Malling, Danish composer
 Søren Malling, Danish actor

Danish-language surnames